= Fifth Avenue Shoe Repair =

Swedish fashion label

Fifth Avenue Shoe Repair was a Swedish fashion label founded in 2004 by Astrid Olsson and Lee Cotter. In January 2009 the label received the "Designer of the Year" at the Swedish Elle Style Awards. The brand filed for bankruptcy in April 2014. By then, Astrid Olsson and Lee Cotter had already sold the company to Göte David Johansson.

The label carried two lines; a ready to wear line as well as a couture inspired line that went under the name "By the no".
